Glauco Bermudez is a Mexican Canadian cinematographer. He is most noted for his work on the 2016 film Before the Streets (Avant les rues), for which he was nominated for both the Canadian Screen Award for Best Cinematography and the Prix Iris for Best Cinematography, and the 2020 film Influence, for which he was nominated for the Canadian Screen Award for Best Cinematography in a Documentary.

Originally from Mexico City, Bermudez moved to Montreal, Quebec to study cinematography at the Mel Hoppenheim School of Cinema. He remains based in Montreal, but has continued to work in both Canadian and Mexican cinema.

References

External links

Canadian cinematographers
Mexican cinematographers
Mexican emigrants to Canada
Concordia University alumni
People from Montreal
Living people
Year of birth missing (living people)